Olivia Clara Canavan (born 1 September 2006) is a Northern Irish professional footballer who plays as a right-back and centre-back for Glentoran W.F.C. and the Northern Ireland national under-17 football team.

Early life 
Canavan was born on 1 September 2006 in County Donegal, Republic of Ireland. She started playing football at the inspiration of her brother. Her favourite players are Linfield defender Ashley Hutton and England international defender Lucy Bronze.  Though she has been diagnosed with congenital stationary night blindness, she has learned to “identify her teammates by focusing on colour, shapes, movement, and voice recognition.”  For her outstanding achievement, she has been awarded the Mary Peters Trust.

Club career 
When she was 15, Canavan joined Bangor FC, with whom she spent two seasons, during which she also played with boys.  She joined Glentoran in 2022.

International career 
Canavan has been called up to the Northern Ireland under-17 national team.  She debuted on 28 October 2021, in an unstreamed game against the Republic of Ireland. She has played in the UEFA U-17 Championship qualifications.

References 

Living people
2006 births
People from County Donegal
Association footballers from County Donegal
Women's association footballers from Northern Ireland
Northern Ireland women's international footballers
Women's association football defenders